A total lunar eclipse took place on Tuesday 9 January 2001, the first of three lunar eclipses in 2001. A shallow total eclipse saw the Moon in relative darkness for 1 hour 1 minute and 2 seconds. The Moon was 18.89% of its diameter into the Earth's umbral shadow, and totality was observed in all of Europe, Africa, and Asia. The partial eclipse lasted for 3 hours 16 minutes and 19 seconds and was visible in parts of north-eastern North America and Australia. It is the only total eclipse of 2001. It was visible over Asia and Western Australia with the Middle East getting mid eclipse at midnight.

Visibility

Related lunar eclipses

Eclipses of 2001 
 A total lunar eclipse on January 9.
 A total solar eclipse on June 21.
 A partial lunar eclipse on July 5.
 An annular solar eclipse on December 14.
 A penumbral lunar eclipse on December 30.

Lunar year series

Half-Saros cycle
A lunar eclipse will be preceded and followed by solar eclipses by 9 years and 5.5 days (a half saros). This lunar eclipse is related to two annular solar eclipses of Solar Saros 141.

See also 
List of lunar eclipses
List of 21st-century lunar eclipses

References

External links 
 Saros cycle 134
 
 Jan. 9, 2001 Lunar Eclipse Gallery 
 
 NASA 2001 Jan 09: Total Lunar Eclipse
 Total Lunar Eclipses seen from Cape Town Total lunar eclipse, January 9, 2001.

2001-01
2001 in science
January 2001 events